Miersiella is a genus of crabs in the family Xanthidae, containing the following species:
Miersiella cavifrons Takeda, 1989
Miersiella haswelli (Miers, 1886)

References

Xanthoidea